Haftsin is an arrangement of seven symbolic items whose names start with the letter "س" (pronounced as "seen"), the 15th letter in the Persian alphabet; "haft" (هفت) is Persian for "seven". It is traditionally displayed at Nowruz, the Iranian New Year, which is celebrated on the day of the vernal equinox, marking the beginning of spring in the Northern Hemisphere.

Items of Haft-seen

The following are the primary items of Haft-seen, whose Persian names begin with the letter S in the Persian alphabet.
 – wheat, barley, mung bean, or lentil sprouts grown in a dish.
 – wheat germ sweet pudding.
 – oleaster.
 – vinegar.
 – apple.
 – garlic.
 – sumac.

Coins (سکه sekke), hyacinth (سنبل sombol), and clock (ساعت suat also pronounced so-at) are sometimes included too. Other symbolic items that are typically used to accompany Haft-sin include a mirror, candles, painted eggs, goldfish, and traditional Persian confections.

A "book of wisdom" is also commonly included, which might be , Avesta, the Shahnameh, or the Divān of Hafez.

Symbolic Roots of Haft-seen
The Haft-Seen table is composed of “haft” (or seven) essential symbols that represent nature, and “sin” which may have been shortened from “sini” (or trays), which held these essential symbols. The symbols break down into three from the material world (or “donyaheh mahdoodiat”), three from the immaterial world (or “donayeh maanah”) — this is the world of meaning and ideas — and one symbol that sits between and ties these two worlds together. By tradition, Iranian families take great pains to create the most beautiful Haft-Seen table that they can, for not only does it embody values both traditional and spiritual, it is also appreciated by the visitors during Nowruz visiting exchanges as a reflection of the families' aesthetic sense and  good taste. 

Items that start with Persian letter "س":

Sabzeh: Sprouting /Grass: the symbol of rebirth and growth. 
Samanu:  the symbol of power and strength.
Senjed: the symbol of love.
Somāq: Sumac: the symbol of sunrise. 
Serkeh: Vinegar:  the symbol of patience. 
Seeb: Apple:  the symbol of beauty. 
Seer: Garlic:  the symbol of health and medicine.

Other items that start with Persian letter "س" that are sometimes included: 
Sonbol: Hyacinth:  the symbol of spring's arrival. 
Sekkeh: Coin: the symbol of matter, material world, wealth and prosperity.
Saat: Clock: the symbol of time.

Items that don't start with "س" but, nonetheless, are invariably included:
Tokhm-e Morg Rangi: Eggs: the symbol of fertility. 
Ayina: Mirror: the symbol of self-reflection.
Shem'a: Candle: the symbol of enlightenment. 
Maahi-ye Qırmız: Goldfish: the symbol of progress.
Ketaab: Book: the symbol of wisdom.

Afghan Haft Mewa  
In Afghanistan, people prepare Haft Mēwa (literally translates as Seven Fruits) in addition to or instead of Haft Seen which is common in Iran. Haft Mewa is like a fruit salad made from seven different dried fruits, served in their own syrup. The seven dried fruits are: raisins, Senjed (the dried fruit of the oleaster tree), pistachios, hazelnuts, prunes (dried apricots), walnuts and either almonds or another species of plum fruit.

Gallery

See also
Passover Seder plate, an aesthetically similar (except for its element of animal sacrifice, a practice strictly banned by Zoroastrians) display for the Jewish holiday of Passover.
Twelve-dish Christmas Eve supper

References

External links

Haft-sin
Ceremonial food and drink
Persian words and phrases
Goldfish in culture